The Dance of the Seven Veils is Salome's dance performed before King Herod Antipas, in modern stage, literature and visual arts. It is an elaboration on the New Testament story of the Feast of Herod and the execution of John the Baptist, which refers to Salome dancing before the king, but does not give the dance a name.

The name "Dance of the Seven Veils" originates with the 1893 English translation of Oscar Wilde's 1891 French play Salome in the stage direction "Salome dances the dance of the seven veils". The dance was also incorporated into Richard Strauss's 1905 opera Salome.

Biblical account
According to ten verses of Matthew 14, John was imprisoned for criticizing King Herod Antipas's marriage to Herodias, the former wife of Antipas's half-brother Herod II. Herod offered his niece a reward of her choice for performing a dance for his guests on his birthday. Herodias persuaded her daughter to ask for John the Baptist's head on a platter. Against his better judgment, Herod reluctantly acceded to her request.

Josephus
The Romano-Jewish historian Josephus lists Antipas's stepdaughter's name as Salome, but makes no mention of a dance nor makes any connection between Salome and John the Baptist.

Oscar Wilde

The idea that Salome's dance involves "seven veils" originates with Wilde's 1891 play Salomé. Wilde was influenced by earlier French writers who had transformed the image of Salome into an incarnation of female lust. Rachel Shteir writes that,

Wilde was especially influenced by Gustave Flaubert's story "Herodias" in which Salome dances on her hands to please Antipas. The type of dance was common among "gypsy" acrobats in the 19th century. Wilde at first intended to follow Flaubert's version, but changed his mind. Shireen Malik says he may have been influenced by the 1870 poem "The Daughter of Herodias" by Arthur O'Shaughnessy which describes Salome dancing:

She freed and floated on the air her arms
Above dim veils that hid her bosom's charms...
The veils fell round her like thin coiling mists
Shot through by topaz suns and amethysts.

The poem goes on to describe brief views of her "jewelled body" as the flowing veils swirl and part.

Wilde transforms the dance from a public performance for his guests, as in the Bible, to a personal dance for the king himself. He gives no description of the dance beyond the name, but the idea of a series of veils has been connected to a process of unveiling. As Malik says, "although Wilde does not describe Salome's dance or suggest that she remove any veils, her dance is invariably assumed to be one of unveiling, thus revealing herself." Wilde's play has even been proposed as the origin of striptease. Toni Bentley writes "Wilde's bracketed brevity allowed for a world of interpretation. Can the invention of striptease be traced to a single innocuous stage direction in a censored play that could barely find a theater or audience? Can Oscar Wilde be considered the unlikely father of modern striptease?"

In one of Aubrey Beardsley's illustrations to the play, he depicts what he calls a "stomach dance" (i.e., a belly dance), in which Salome is depicted with exposed breasts and undulating belly, wearing transparent pantaloons. Wilde wrote a note in appreciation of Beardsley's design, saying: "For Aubrey: for the only artist who, besides myself, knows what the dance of the seven veils is, and can see that invisible dance." The concept of "belly dancing" had become widely known in 1893, the year before Beardsley created his designs, when it was featured at the World's Fair in Chicago that year.

Origin of the "veil" dance 

Bentley notes that the Mesopotamian  goddess Inanna "performed the first documented striptease" when she descended into the Kur (underworld), ruled by her sister Ereshkigal, in search of her faithless lover Dumuzid. Inanna had to divest herself of the mysterious "seven mé " (conjecturally, her various jewels and robes) in her descent through seven successive gates leading ever deeper into the underworld until at last she stood naked in the 'land of no return.'  Oscar Wilde assigned this symbolic descent to the underworld of the unconscious, a ceremony that equates stripping naked to being in a state of truth, the ultimate unveiling, to Salome." Writing from a Jungian perspective, Perera has demonstrated the same for the far older Sumerian myth of the descent of Inanna.

Wilde's concept of "seven veils" is believed to be derived from the popularity of what were known as veil dances at the time. These were westernised versions of imagined Middle Eastern styles of dance. The dancer Loïe Fuller was especially associated with such dances. In 1886, Fuller appeared at New York's Standard Theater in a show called The Arabian Nights. According to Rhonda Garelick, this "featured fourteen different Oriental dance numbers, including the 'Veil of Vapor' dance, done with clouds of steam instead of fabric veils."

The Hebrew word chuwl, meaning  to twist or whirl (in a circular or spiral manner), is used in Judges 21:21-23, Judges 11.34, and I Samuel 18.6-7. In these instances it refers to a type of erotic dance done during biblical ceremonies, and performed by women. Most notably, in Canaan before 900 BC, a small piece of cloth worn around the hips (ḥagor), would have been all that was worn.

Richard Strauss
Strauss's operatic adaptation of the play also features the Dance of the Seven Veils. The dance remains unnamed except in the acting notes, but Salome's sexual fascination with John seems to motivate the request—though Herod is portrayed as pleased. The music for the dance comes from near the climax of the opera. The visual content of that scene (about seven minutes long with standard tempi) has varied greatly depending on the aesthetic notions of the stage director, choreographer, and soprano, and on the choreographic skills and body shape of that singer. Strauss himself stipulated that the dance should be "thoroughly decent, as if it were being done on a prayer mat." Nevertheless, many productions made the dance explicitly erotic. In a 1907 production in New York  the dancer "spared the audience nothing in active and suggestive detail", to such an extent that some ladies in the audience "covered their eyes with their programs."

Ernst Krause argues that Strauss's version of the dance "established the modern musical formula for the portrayal of ecstatic sensual desire and brought it to perfection." In Derek B Scott's view, "The eroticism of the 'Dance of the Seven Veils' is encoded in the sensual richness (timbral and textual) of a huge orchestra, the quasi-Oriental embellishment of melody (intimations of 'exotic' sensuality), and the devices of crescendo and quickening pace (suggestive of growing excitement)."

Later versions
The Wilde play and the Strauss opera led to the phenomenon of "Salomania", in which various performers put on acts inspired by Salome's erotic dance. Several of these were criticised for being salacious and close to stripping, leading to "insistent vogue for women doing glamorous and exotic 'oriental' dances in striptease".  In 1906 Maude Allan's production "Vision of Salomé" opened in Vienna. Based loosely on Wilde's play, her version of the Dance of the Seven Veils became famous (and to some notorious) and she was billed as "The Salomé Dancer". Her version was praised for the "eastern spirit" of her dancing without the "vulgarities familiar to the tourists in Cairo or Tangier". The dance first appeared in film in 1908 in a Vitagraph production entitled Salome, or the Dance of the Seven Veils.

In the 1953 film Salome, Rita Hayworth performs the dance as a strip dance. She stops the dance before removing her last veil when she sees John's head being delivered on a platter, as she did not want him to be killed in this version of the story.

In the 1961 film King of Kings, Salomé, portrayed by Brigid Bazlen, performs a similar dance; her voluptuous seduction of a drunken lascivious Herod Antipas remains highly praised and is now widely regarded as Bazlen's best performance.

Salome and the dance are recurring thematic and plot elements in Tom Robbins's 1990 novel Skinny Legs and All.

References

External links

Salome dance of the 7 veils (Rita Hayworth as Salome in a scene from the movie Salome); YouTube

Erotic dance
John the Baptist
Works based on the Bible
Oscar Wilde
Gospel of Matthew
Inanna
Cultural depictions of Salome